Manston railway station served the suburb of Manston, North Yorkshire, England, from 1834 to 1869 on the Leeds and Selby Railway.

History 
The station was opened on 22 September 1834 by the Leeds and Selby Railway. It closed on 9 November 1840 but reopened in November 1850, before closing permanently on 1 April 1869.

References 

Disused railway stations in North Yorkshire
Railway stations in Great Britain opened in 1834
Railway stations in Great Britain closed in 1840
Railway stations in Great Britain opened in 1850
Railway stations in Great Britain closed in 1869
1834 establishments in England
1869 disestablishments in England